Martin French may refer to:

Martin French (mayor), Mayor of Galway in 1579–1580
Martin French (MP), for Hythe (UK Parliament constituency) in 1407–1410